The Kish Bank (Irish: Banc na Cise) is a shallow sand bank approximately  off the coast of Dublin, in Ireland. It is marked by the Kish Lighthouse, a landmark visible to sailors and ferry passengers passing through Dublin Bay and Dún Laoghaire harbour.

Many ships were wrecked on these shallows. The Vesper was lost in January 1876; the Norwegian MV Bolivar ran aground on the Kish Bank during a snow storm on 4 March 1947; both wrecks are frequently dived. A mailboat operated by the City of Dublin Steam Packet Company between Kingstown (now Dún Laoghaire) and Holyhead, was torpedoed and sunk by a German submarine on 10 October 1918. Fifty-five wrecks are listed for the Kish Bank area.

Lighthouse
Before the present Kish lighthouse was installed in 1965, the sandbank had been marked by a lightvessel since 1811. An attempt to build a lighthouse in 1842 was abandoned following the destruction caused by severe weather. The first Irish electric light vessel, Gannet, was installed in 1954.

The Commissioners of Irish Lights decided in 1960 to erect a reinforced concrete lighthouse with a helicopter landing pad on top, designed by Christiani & Nielsen. Construction began in 1963 in the Coal Harbour of Dún Laoghaire, but the first section of the lighthouse cracked while it was being built and had to be discarded. The second telescopic lighthouse was completed and towed out to the sandbank on 29 June 1965. It had a projected lifetime of 75 years.  

The new lighthouse took over from the previous light vessel on 9 November 1965. The lighthouse was automated on 7 April 1992, and the keepers came ashore.

In July 2018, Cunningham Civil & Marine undertook an overhaul of the site, including repainting and the upgrading of helicopter netting.

Proposed windfarm
In late 1999, the Department of Marine and Natural Resources awarded licenses to allow studies to be carried out on the Kish and Bray Banks in relation to the construction of a proposed offshore wind farm. Press reports at the time suggested that 100 or more wind turbines could be erected. As of March 2001, it was reported that the ESB Group had been afforded a foreshore licence to undertake related surveys.

By late 2020, the proposed development (titled the "Dublin Array" project) was associated with the Irish company Saorgus Energy and German energy company RWE. In December 2022, the Department of the Environment granted 'Maritime Area Consent' (MAC) to RWE and Saorgus Energy, to progress the Dublin Array wind farm, to be "located on the Kish Bank and Bray Bank, roughly 10km off the coast of south Co Dublin and Co Wicklow". If built as planned it would "comprise between 45 and 61 wind turbines with capacity to generate between 600 and 900 megawatts of renewable energy". Following MAC approval, "RWE is now required to submit a planning application to An Bord Pleanála".

Burials at sea
At the time when the Department of the Marine permitted burial at sea (of people who had died on land), they normally required the burial to occur at the Kish Bank where the tides are strong, and where the sands are always moving.

See also

 List of islands of Ireland
 Coastal landforms of Ireland
 List of lighthouses in Ireland
 Commissioners of Irish Lights

References

External links

Commissioners of Irish Lights

Lighthouses in the Republic of Ireland
Landforms of Dún Laoghaire–Rathdown